Baymurzino (Baymırźa; , Ardaš) is a rural locality (a village) and the administrative centre of Baymurzinsky Selsoviet, Mishkinsky District, Bashkortostan, Russia. The population was 587 as of 2010. There are 11 streets.

Geography 
Baymurzino is located 49 km northwest of Mishkino (the district's administrative centre) by road. Buklendy is the nearest rural locality.

References 

Rural localities in Mishkinsky District